The State Bar  of South Dakota is the integrated (mandatory) bar association of the U.S. state of South Dakota.

History 
The State Bar of South Dakota was established in 1931 by the South Dakota Legislature, pursuant to South Dakota Supreme Court Rule.

Structure
The State Bar is governed by a Board of Bar Commissioners,  consisting of three officers, 7 Commissioners elected by District, and 6 Commissioners elected at-large.  

The State Bar dedicates $100 of each member's dues to Continuing Legal Education, entitling each member to attend all CLE programs without additional charge. It also publishes the Monthly State Bar of South Dakota Newsletter.

References

American state bar associations
Government of South Dakota
1931 establishments in South Dakota
Organizations established in 1931